Triangle Lake Bog or Triangle Lake Bog State Nature Preserve is a  state nature preserve in the U.S. state of Ohio. It is located in Rootstown Township, south of Ravenna.

Flora 
It is home to a number of plants including the round-leaved sundew, leatherleaf, highbush blueberry, large cranberry, poison sumac, sphagnum moss and catberry.

Landscape

External links
Official site

Bogs of Ohio
Ohio State Nature Preserves
Protected areas of Portage County, Ohio
Landforms of Portage County, Ohio